Laura Kampf (born 15 August 1983) is a German YouTuber, designer, and craftswoman. Kampf refers to herself as a 'maker.' Her content primarily focusses on DIY build projects.

Early life 
Kampf was born in Wiehl, Germany on August 15 1983. Her father was an advertiser and her mother was a housewife. After high school, Kampf studied design in college, after initially training as a media designer.

Career 
Based in Cologne, Kampf began making YouTube videos on her eponymous channel in 2015. On her channel, Kampf has built many projects, including butcher block side tables, a side-car for her bicycle made from a beer keg, a bike trailer made from second-hand wheelbarrows, a yakitori grill made from a repurposed I-beam, and a grill made from a toolbox.

Kampf has frequently collaborated with YouTuber Simone Giertz. She helped Giertz build Truckla, a Tesla Model 3 adapted to be a truck, in 2019. Both women worked with Adam Savage in 2021 to build Mad-Max-style battle cars. In 2022, Giertz's company, Yetch, released their set of Build Dice, co-designed by Giertz and Kampf, to help people come up with new project ideas.

Kampf had worked on the German show Die Sendung mit der Maus (The Show with the Mouse) as a "Maus"-expert and "Do-it-your-self-Frau" (Do-it-yourself woman). She also worked on the show Schrott or Not. In 2020, Kampf was awarded a Goldene Kamera Digital Award in the category, Best of Education & Coaching.

Personal life 
Kampf is a lesbian.

References 

German YouTubers
LGBT YouTubers
DIY YouTubers
German artisans
1983 births
Living people
German LGBT entertainers